James Buchanan Frame (22 October 1929 – 2013) was a Scottish footballer who played for Rangers, Dumbarton and Worcester.

Frame died in East Kilbride in 2013, at the age of 83.

References

1929 births
2013 deaths
Scottish footballers
Dumbarton F.C. players
Rangers F.C. players
Scottish Football League players
Association football forwards